Bartley Christopher Frueh (born 1963) is a clinical psychologist and American author.

Early life and education
Frueh was born in New York City in 1963.  He received his Bachelor of Arts in psychology from Kenyon College in 1985 and his PhD in Clinical Psychology from the University of South Florida in 1992.

Career
Frueh is a licensed clinical psychologist and holds faculty appointments as Professor of Psychology at the University of Hawaii at Hilo, Clinical Professor of Psychiatry, University of Texas Health Science Center, Houston, TX, and adjunct professor, Psychiatry in Neurosurgery, Houston Methodist Academic Institute.

Formerly, Frueh was a professor of psychiatry at both Baylor College of Medicine and the Medical University of South Carolina in Charleston, South Carolina, as well as Director of Research at The Menninger Clinic in Houston, Texas. He also spent 15 years as a staff psychologist and director of the PTSD Clinic at the Veteran Affairs Medical Center in Charleston, South Carolina. He has 30 years of professional experience working with military veterans and active-duty personnel.

Frueh also sits on the Scientific Advisory Panel for both the SEAL Future Foundation and Boulder Crest Foundation, the Wellness Advisory Board for the Military Special Operations Family Collaborative, and the Medical Advisory Committee for the PTSD Foundation of America.

He has served as a paid contractor for the Department of Defense, Veterans Affairs, US State Department, and the National Board of Medical Examiners. Frueh's mental health related commentaries have also been published in National Review, Huffington Post, The New York Times, Men's Journal, and Special Operation Association of America; and has been quoted or cited in The Washington Post, Scientific American, The Wall Street Journal, The Economist, Stars and Stripes, USA Today, Men’s Health, Los Angeles Times, Reuter, Associated Press, and NBC News.

Research
Frueh has conducted clinical trials, epidemiology, historical epidemiology, and neuroscience research, primarily with combat veterans, and has acted as principal investigator on 15 federally funded research projects and co-investigator, mentor, or consultant on over 25 others. The focus of much of Frueh's research is aimed towards trauma survivors experiencing psychological disorders such as Post-Traumatic Stress Disorder. Over the course of his career Frueh has authored over 300 peer reviewed scientific publications.

Most cited works
Prevalence Estimates of Combat-Related Post-Traumatic Stress Disorder: Critical Review 
 Poly-Victimization and Risk of Posttraumatic, Depressive, and Substance Use Disorders and Involvement in Delinquency in a National Sample of Adolescents
 Special Section on Seclusion and Restraint: Patients' Reports of Traumatic or Harmful Experiences Within the Psychiatric Setting
 Current directions in videoconferencing tele-mental health research
 Apparent symptom overreporting in combat veterans evaluated for ptsd

Recent works
Frueh is co-author of Assessment and Treatment Planning for PTSD, a guide providing evidence-based approaches for the diagnosis and treatment of PTSD.

Additionally, under the pen name of Christopher Bartley, he is a noir crime novelist who created the hardboiled Ross Duncan Series (They Die Alone, 2013, etc.) set in 1934 America at the end of the Prohibition during the public enemy era. The series’ protagonist, Ross Duncan, is a hunted criminal, but he is also a wandering observer who engages with people from all strata of society, polite or otherwise.

Ross Duncan series
 They Die Alone (2013) 
 Sleep Not, My Child (2013) 
 For a Sin Offering (2013) 
 To Catch is Not to Hold (2013) 
 Unto the Daughters of Men (2013) 
 A Bullet to Dream Of (2014) 
 Every Secret Thing (2014) 
 Naked Shall I Return (2015)  
More recently, Frueh has also published A Season’s Past (2019), a collection of novellas featuring men with guns and their search for meaning and intimacy.

References

1963 births
American psychology writers
Living people
21st-century American psychologists
Clinical psychologists
Kenyon College alumni
University of South Florida alumni
University of Hawaiʻi faculty
Baylor College of Medicine faculty
Medical University of South Carolina faculty
21st-century American novelists
Crime novelists
Writers from New York City
American male novelists
Scientists from Hawaii
21st-century American male writers
Novelists from New York (state)
Novelists from Texas
21st-century American non-fiction writers
American male non-fiction writers
20th-century American psychologists